Jeevana Chaitra is a 1992 Indian Kannada language film directed by the duo Dorai–Bhagavan starring Rajkumar and Madhavi. It marked the re-entry of Rajkumar in films after a hiatus of 3 years, and was an instant hit. The film is based on the Kannada novel Vyapthi Prapthi written by Vishalakshi Dakshinamurthy. The movie was initially titled Simhadriya Simha (Simhadri Lion), a title which was later used for a 2002 film starring Dr. Vishnuvardhan. The film re-affirmed the hold Rajkumar had on Kannada audiences. The film was highly successful at the box office and had a theatrical run of 52 weeks.

The characterization of Rani Mukerji's role in Kabhi Khushi Kabhie Gham was based on the role played by Sudharani in this movie.

For the song Naadamaya, Rajkumar won the National Film Award for Best Male Playback Singer at the 40th National Film Awards. The film won four awards at the 1992–93 Karnataka State Film Awards; First Best Film, Best Actor (Rajkumar), Best Music Director (Upendra Kumar) and Best Dialogue Writer (Chi. Udaya Shankar).

Plot
Rama Rao is a jodidar of Simhadri and its surrounding villages. His wife is named Seetha, and their son is Vishwanath. Once, the trio visits a function in the village, where they see Meenakshi. Vishwanath expresses his interest in Meenakshi as his life partner and presents the case before his parents. Vishwanath's father accepts the marriage proposal. Meenakshi and Vishwanath get married. Vishwanath takes over the mantle of jodidar of Simhaadri and eight villages from his father.

He fights illiteracy, the illicit liquor racket, and other social evils, in order to help villagers. He and Meenakshi have three children. There is a parallel comedy storyline of the movie, centering on Putta Joisa, who joins as the priest of the family-entrusted main temple.

Their eldest son, a doctor, falls for his classmate, the daughter of a liquor baron. She, Toogudeepa, creates a rift between father and son and insults Vishwanath when he approaches to discuss the marriage proposal.

Toogudeepa leaves, threatening Gurudutt that he can choose either his father's village or his love. Gurudutt fights with his father and leaves home. This comes as the first blow to Vishwanatha Raya.

Abhijit, the second son, gets married, but his wife is not very happy staying in the village and serving her in-laws. Vishwanath and Meenakshi plan to have Meenakshi's niece get married to their last son Narahari. Narahari, who has a secret love affair, marries her and brings her home, once he learns of his parents' plan.

Meenakshi and Vishwanath are shocked to see Narahari and his wife.The burden is too much for Meenakshi and she dies, while welcoming her new daughter-in-law.

Vishwanath feels lonely and goes on a theertha yaatre, has an accident, and loses his memory. He wanders around and is shown visiting Badri, Rishikesh, Kedarnath and Varanasi. When he finds the beauty of Himalaya, he is spellbound by nature and sings his heart out. Putta Joisa finds his old employer, clothed in rags and singing on a ghaat. He helps Vishwanath regain memory.

Meanwhile, Toogudeepa convinces Vishwanath's three sons to hand over their ancestral property and takes it over.

Vishwanath returns, only to find his home turned from a temple to a tavern. He single-handedly beats drunkards gathered there and questions his sons about his mother. Learning that she is lonely in the passing days in the hut, he visits his mother.

Pandari Bhai is filled with joy to find her son alive. Vishwanath once again starts the task of fighting liquor racket, gambling, and other evils.

He ends up on a winning note, as the gambler's den is made into a primary school and the liquor factory is closed down. His children too learn their lesson and join hands with him.

A happy man, Vishwanath creates a will dividing his assets among his sons and leaves to a higher calling. The last scene shows Vishwanath ascending a hill, far away from Simhaadri.

Cast

Soundtrack

The score of the film and the soundtrack were composed by Upendra Kumar, with lyrics penned by Chi. Udaya Shankar and Mugur Mallappa. The album consists of five soundtracks.

Release and reception

Jeevana Chaitra was very popular when it was released, and the movie tickets became a prized commodity. There was no release by Rajkumar in the previous years.

The movie completed 100 days and had to be removed from theatres. Rajkumar's cut-out of the suit-clad hero had the usual ritual of getting soaked in milk at many places.

Box office
The film ran for 375 days and, owing to the audience reception, Rajkumar had to announce that he would act in another movie, Aakasmika.

Reviews and critiques
The movie received rave reviews, owing to the storyline and message about combating liquor barons.

References

External links
 
http://www.raaga.com/channels/kannada/moviedetail.asp?mid=k0000432

1992 films
1990s Kannada-language films
Indian drama films
Films about alcoholism
Films based on Indian novels
Films scored by Upendra Kumar
Films with screenplays by Chi. Udayashankar
Films directed by Dorai–Bhagavan